Dobruška is a town in Rychnov nad Kněžnou District in the Hradec Králové Region of the Czech Republic. It has about 6,500 inhabitants. The town is known as the birthplace of Czech patriotic writer František Ladislav Hek, whose career was described in Alois Jirásek's novel F. L. Věk. The historic town centre is well preserved and is protected by law as an urban monument zone.

Administrative parts
Villages of Běstviny, Chábory, Domašín, Křovice, Mělčany, Pulice and Spáleniště are administrative parts of Dobruška.

Geography
It lies mostly in the Orlice Table. The town is situated at the confluence of two watercourses, the river Dědina (also called Zlatý Brook) and the Brtevský Brook.

History
The predecessor of Dobruška was a market settlement Lešno, located on the crossroads of two trade routes. The first written mention is from 1320. In 1495, with the arrival of the noble family of Trčka of Lípa, the town began to develop. The houses were reconstructed in the Renaissance style and a representative town hall was built. The prosperity and importance of the town ended with the Thirty Years' War.

The large fires in 1806 and 1866 damaged Dobruška and the reconstructions changed the character of the town. At the end of the 19th century, the industry developed, especially the textile industry. In 1908 Dobruška was connected with Opočno by railway.

Demographics

Economy
The Military Geographical and Hydrometeorological Office is located in Dobruška.

Culture
The International Music Festival of F. L. Vek is organized in Dobruška.

Sights

The historic centre is formed by F. L. Věka Square and adjacent streets. Its main landmark is the Renaissance town hall with a -high tower. In the tower there is the town museum and gallery with early works of F. Kupka. In the middle of the square is a Marian column from 1733.

The Church of Saint Wenceslaus was first mentioned in 1350. Its part is an early Baroque belltower. The cemetery Church of Holy Spirit was built in Renaissance style in the 16th century.

The former Jewish synagogue in Dobruška is nowadays part of the town museum. The synagogue was built in the 18th century and then rebuilt in the Neogothic style in 1867, after it was damaged by a fire. There is also the Jewish cemetery with the oldest preserved tomb from 1688.

Notable people
František Ladislav Hek (1769–1847), patriotic writer
Alois Beer (1833–1897), painter
František Kupka (1871–1957), painter and graphic artist; lived here in 1872–1889
Radim Drejsl (1923–1953), composer, pianist and conductor

Twin towns – sister cities

Dobruška is twinned with:
 Ábrahámhegy, Hungary
 Hnúšťa, Slovakia
 Miejska Górka, Poland
 Piława Górna, Poland
 Radków, Poland
 Veľký Meder, Slovakia

Gallery

References

External links

The International Music Festival of F. L. Věk in Dobruška
Virtual show

Cities and towns in the Czech Republic
Populated places in Rychnov nad Kněžnou District